For information on all Lamar University sports, see Lamar Cardinals and Lady Cardinals

The 2014–15 Lamar Lady Cardinals basketball team represented Lamar University during the 2014–15 NCAA Division I women's basketball season. The Lady Cardinals, led by second year head coach Robin Harmony, played their home games at the Montagne Center and are members of the Southland Conference.

Two Lady Cardinals were recognized by the Southland Conference at the conclusion of the regular season. JaMeisha Edwards was named to both the conference All-Defense team and the All-Southland Conference, 1st team. Dominique Edwards was named to the All-Southland Conference, 3rd team.

Off season 
Randy Schneider was promoted to Associate Head Coach on August 4.  Lejon Wright joined the Lady Cardinals staff as an assistant coach.

On October 20, 2014, it was announced that senior guard Jameisha Edwards will not play for the Cardinals due to a career ending injury.  On December 2, 2014, following medical reevaluation and a compromised participation plan, Jameisha Edwards was cleared to return to the team.

Departures

Class of 2014 transfers and high school recruits 

2014 Transfers and High School Recruits:

Roster

Schedule 

|-
!colspan=12 style="background:#CC2233; color:#FFFFFF;"| Out of Conference Schedule

|-
!colspan=12 style="background:#CC2233; color:#FFFFFF;"| Southland Conference Schedule

|-
!colspan=12 style="background:#CC2233; color:#FFFFFF;"| Southland Conference Tournament

See also 
2014–15 Lamar Cardinals basketball team

References 

Lamar Lady Cardinals basketball seasons
Lamar
Lamar Lady Cardinals basketball
Lamar Lady Cardinals basketball